Xtabentún can refer to:

 Xtabentún (flower)
 Xtabentún (liqueur)